Wal Bamford (1916–1985) was a professional rugby league footballer in the Australian competition, the New South Wales Rugby League.

Walter Hamilton Bamford played for the Eastern Suburbs club in the years 1936 and 1939-1941, although not playing in the final series for the Tricolours he was a member of the premiership winning sides in 1936 and 1940.

Career statistics

References
The Encyclopedia of Rugby League, Alan Whiticker & Glen Hudson

1916 births
1985 deaths
Australian rugby league players
Rugby league players from New South Wales
Sydney Roosters players
Place of birth missing